The UK Beatbox Championships (UKBC) are hosted every year in London, England. This historic annual all-day event, which brings together the country's top beatbox artists for gladiatorial knock-out of face to face beatbox battles, in five different categories solo, female, team, loopstation and under-18. The 2019 UK Beatbox Championships was held on 23 and 24 November 2019.

History
The UK Beatbox Championships are one of the major tournaments in British Hip Hop music scene, and has been held at various venues in its history that include the Scala at Kings Cross, the O2 Academy Islington, the Garage, Highbury  the Grand Theatre, Clapham, London and the Battersea Arts Centre The first ever UK Beatbox Championship took place in 2005 in London, England, hosted by UK Beatbox Championships. 
Qualification for the UK Beatbox Championships consists of geographical heats held around Britain, which are contested from February through to June in London(South-east), Bristol (South-West) (Bristol heats), Nottingham (Midlands) and Liverpool (North). 
Beatboxing is the art of producing percussion, rhythm and musical sounds using only parts of the human body, namely the mouth, lips, tongue, vocal cords, nasal passage and throat. The event attracts around 1000 spectators and is live streamed to around 90 countries globally. 
A panel of highly respected judges include former winners and international judges from the beatboxing fraternity. 
The judges listen for originality, musical composition, technique, clarity, complexity, timing, rhythm, flow, and performance. They look for witty response in battle, ingenuity, endurance and intelligence.

In 2020, because of the Covid-19 Pandemic, the UKBB championships were successfully held online, the judges included Chiwawa, Chris Selez, D-Low, Kim, Sizzler, Frosty, Inkie and Rythmind.

Timeline
2005 UKBB inaugural event won by Faith FSX. 
The tournament was sponsored in the early years by Vauxhall, since then the sponsor has been Relentless energy drink and Popbox. 
The winners of each title qualify for the Beatbox Battle World Championship in Berlin.
2006 - Solo was won by Beardyman 
2007 - Solo was won by Beardyman
2008 - Solo was won by MC Zani
2009 - Solo was won by Reeps One
2010 - Solo was won by Reeps One
2011 - Solo was won by Ball-Zee
2012 - Male Solo was won by Ball-Zee
2012 - A solo event for ladies was introduced and was won by Grace Savage.  
2012 - A team event was introduced and was won by Illbits.  
2013 - Solo was won by Ball-Zee
2013 - Solo Female was won by Grace Savage
2013 - Team event was won by Illbits
2014 - Solo was won by Contirx
2014 - Solo Female was won by Bellatrix
2014 - Team event was won by Illbits
2014 - Loopstation was introduced and was won by Hobbit. 
2014 - An Under 18 tournament was introduced and was won by D-Low. 
2015 - Solo was won by D-Low
2015 - Solo Female was abolished as a category
2015 - Team Category was won by all female beatbox team BURD (Bellatrix and Grace Savage)
2015 - Loopstation was won by OxBox. 
2015 - Under 18 was won by RedBeard
2016 - Solo was won by D-Low
2016 - Team Category was won by all female beatbox team BURD (Bellatrix and Grace Savage)
2016 - Loopstation was won by Bellatrix
2016 - Under 18 was won by Frosty
2017 - Solo was won by Frosty
2017 - Team Category was won by Kotcha
2017 - Loopstation was won by Balance 
2017 - Under 18 was won by Epos
2018 - Solo was won by D-Low
2018 - Team Category was won by Kotcha
2018 - Loopstation was won by Balance 
2018 - Under 18 was won by Jeddzino
2019 - Solo was won by ABH
2019 - Team Category was won by A-Cloud
2019 - Loopstation was won by Frosty 
2019 - Under 18 was won by Kyleeshvns
2020 - Due to the Covid-19 Pandemic, only the Solo and Loopstation events went ahead and were held online.
2021
2022

UKBC Historical results 2005 to present

References

External links
 UK Beatbox Championships on facebook
 Swissbeatbox.com - World's largest Beatbox Platform
 Beatboxbattle.tv - Organizer of the World Beatbox Championship
 Humanbeatbox.com - One of the first Beatboxing Online-Communities

Beatboxing
Recurring events established in 2005